Brian Dabul was the defending champion and 1st seed, however he lost to the eventual champion Andrés Molteni.
Molteni defeated Horacio Zeballos 7–5, 7–6(4) in the final. It was the first challenger title of his career.

Seeds

Draw

Finals

Top half

Bottom half

References
 Main Draw
 Qualifying Draw

Challenger ATP de Salinas Diario Expreso - Singles
2011 Singles